Altin Kaftira (born 1972 in Albania) is a former danseur with the Dutch National Ballet in Amsterdam, Netherlands. He danced with the Ballet from 1995 on, and from 2000 to 2007 was the Ballet's principal dancer (working with choreographers such as Hans van Manen, Rudi van Dantzig, Jerome Robbins, Alexei Ratmansky, Christopher Wheeldon and Ted Brandsen), and has danced in almost a dozen George Balanchine ballets. In 2007, he left to pursue a career as a filmmaker. One of his first film assignments was the production and direction of the 75th anniversary gala for Hans van Manen.

In 2002 the then-president of Albania, Rexhep Meidani, awarded Kaftira with the title of Art's Ambassador of the Nation.
In an interview with Kaftira just before his retirement, Dutch critic and writer Herman Stevens, in an article in the Dutch magazine HP/De Tijd, called him an audience favorite, a star possessing the most charisma of any dancer at the National Ballet.

Kaftira as principal dancer, Dutch National Ballet
February - March 2000: Apollo in Apollon musagète (Igor Stravinsky), Muziektheater, Amsterdam
May 2001: Twilight (music by John Cage), Sadler's Wells Theatre, London
December 2004: Petrushka in Petrushka (Sergei Diaghilev), Muziektheater, Amsterdam
2005: Don Giovanni in Don Giovanni (music by Mozart, choreography by Krzysztof Pastor), Muziektheater, Amsterdam
August 2005: the husband in The Concert (music by Frédéric Chopin, choreography by Jerome Robbins), Edinburgh International Festival, Edinburgh Playhouse
November 2006, Vier Letzte Lieder (music by Richard Strauss, choreography by Rudi van Dantzig), Sadler's Wells Theatre, London
August 2006: Into the Agape (choreography by Altin Naska), Atheneaum Theatre, Chicago
2006: Romeo in Romeo and Juliet (music by Sergei Prokofiev, choreography by Rudi van Dantzig), Hong Kong

References

External links
Altin Kaftira

Albanian male ballet dancers
1972 births
Living people
University of Arts (Albania) alumni